FACIT collagen (Fibril Associated Collagens with Interrupted Triple helices) is a type of collagen which is also a proteoglycan.

FACIT collagens include collagen types IX, XII, XIV, XIX, and XXI.

COL22A1 is also included in this class.

See also
 Triple helix
 Collagen helix

References

Structural proteins